John Phillips (November 4, 1823 – July 26, 1903) was an American physician and politician.

Biography
John Phillips was born in Richmond, Vermont. He moved to Wiota, Wisconsin Territory in 1846, where he taught school and studied medicine. In 1848, he moved to Stevens Point, Wisconsin. Phillips graduated from Rush Medical College in 1853.

He was an abolitionist. He served in local government in town government, board of education, and on the Portage County, Wisconsin Board of Supervisors. He served in the Wisconsin State Assembly in 1860 and 1864 as a Republican and in the Wisconsin State Senate in 1891. He also served on the Wisconsin Normal School Board of Regents and on the United States Military Academy Board of Visitors.

Phillips died in Stevens Point on July 26, 1903.

Notes

1823 births
1903 deaths
People from Richmond, Vermont
People from Wiota, Wisconsin
People from Stevens Point, Wisconsin
Rush Medical College alumni
American abolitionists
Physicians from Wisconsin
County supervisors in Wisconsin
Republican Party members of the Wisconsin State Assembly
Republican Party Wisconsin state senators
19th-century American politicians